Toni Stephanie Shaw (born 5 August 2003) is a British Paralympic swimmer. In 2019 she set the world record time for the S9 200m butterfly, and was also part of the team that set a new world record for the 4x100m medley relay. At the 2020 Summer Paralympics, she won a bronze medal in the women's 400 metre freestyle S9 event and later went on to win gold at the 2022 World Para Swimming Championships, becoming the World Champion. She is a three-time World Champion and two-time European Champion.

Personal life and career
Shaw's right arm never fully formed and she was born without her right hand. From 2019 Shaw started using a carbon fibre prosthetic for her arm that with the use of different attachments enabled her to undertake upper-body exercises such as press-ups and weight training that benefit swimmers but had previously not been possible for her.

Shaw was born on 5 August 2003 and took swimming lessons from the age of eight. At the age of 14, she held 14 Scottish national swimming records in the S9 and S10 classifications and was selected to compete for Team Scotland at the 2018 Commonwealth Games where she finished 5th in both the Women's S9 100m Backstroke and Women's 100-metre freestyle S9; 6th in the Women's 200-metre individual medley SM10, and seventh in the Women's 100-metre breaststroke SB9.

She set a new world record time of 2.30.46 in the S9 200m butterfly at the Para-swimming World Series in Berlin in 2019 at the age of 15, and won six medals at the 2019 World Para Swimming Championships, including gold medals in the 4x100m medley relay and the 4x100m freestyle relay. The 4x100m medley relay team, comprising Alice Tai, Brock Whiston, Shaw and Stephanie Millward beat the second-placed United States team by 22 seconds and set a new world record of 4.36.31.

Shaw was coached by the Aberdeen University performance swimming coach Gregor McMillan and trained at Aberdeen Sports Village Aquatics Centre. She was one of ten nominees for BBC Young Sports Personality of the Year in 2019. Shaw currently Swims for University of Stirling while doing an undergraduate degree in Business.

In June 2022, Shaw won Bronze in the Women's 100m Butterfly S9 at the 2022 World Para Swimming Championships in Funchal, Madeira, qualifying first her heat for the final. She also came 5th in the SM9 200m Individual Medley. On 16 June, Shaw won gold in the women's 400 metre freestyle S9,and became the World Champion.

On the first day of swimming competition at the 2022 Commonwealth Games, held in Birmingham, England Shaw won bronze in the S9 100m Freestyle at the 2022 Commonwealth Games in a time of 1:03.75,finishing one one-hundredth of a second behind Australia's Emily Beecroft.

Record in major competitions

2018 Commonwealth Games
5th – Women's S9 100m Backstroke
5th – Women's 100-metre freestyle S9
6th – Women's 200-metre individual medley SM10
7th – Women's 100-metre breaststroke SB9

2018 World Para Swimming European Championships
1st –Women's 400 metres freestyle
1st – Women's 4 x 100 metres medley relay
2nd – Women's 200 metres individual medley
2nd – Women's 100 metres butterfly
3rd – Women's 100 metres backstroke

2019 World Para Swimming Championships
5th – Women's S9 50m Freestyle
3rd – Women's S9 100m Freestyle
2nd – Women's S9 400m Freestyle
2nd – Women's S9 100m Butterfly
3rd – Women's S9 200m Individual Medley
1st – Women's 34pt 4x100m Medley Relay
1st – Women's 34pt 4x100m Freestyle Relay
2022 World Para Swimming Championships

 4th – Women's S9 100m Freestyle
 4th – Women's S9 200m Individual Medley
 3rd – Women's S9 100m Butterfly
 1st – Women's S9 400m Freestyle
2022 Commonwealth Games

 3rd-Women's S9 100m Freestyle

References

External links
 
 

2003 births
Living people
People educated at Albyn School
Scottish female freestyle swimmers
Paralympic swimmers of Great Britain
Medalists at the World Para Swimming Championships
Medalists at the World Para Swimming European Championships
Swimmers at the 2020 Summer Paralympics
Medalists at the 2020 Summer Paralympics
Paralympic bronze medalists for Great Britain
Paralympic medalists in swimming
Sportspeople from Aberdeen
British female backstroke swimmers
British female butterfly swimmers
British female medley swimmers
British female breaststroke swimmers
S9-classified Paralympic swimmers
Swimmers at the 2022 Commonwealth Games
Commonwealth Games medallists in swimming
Commonwealth Games bronze medallists for Scotland
Medallists at the 2022 Commonwealth Games